The Stör is a river of Mecklenburg-Vorpommern, Germany. It is the natural outflow of Lake Schwerin, towards the south. The canalized part south of Banzkow is called Störkanal. It flows into the Elde near Neustadt-Glewe.

See also
List of rivers of Mecklenburg-Vorpommern

Rivers of Mecklenburg-Western Pomerania
Rivers of Germany